Mapam (an acronym for) was a left-wing political party in Israel. The party is one of the ancestors of the modern-day Meretz party.

History

Mapam was formed by a January 1948 merger of the kibbutz-based Hashomer Hatzair Workers Party, the non-kibbutz-based Socialist League, and the left-Labor Zionist Ahdut HaAvoda Poale Zion Movement. The party was originally Marxist-Zionist in its outlook, and represented the left-wing Kibbutz Artzi movement. It also took over the Hashomer Hatzair-affiliated newspaper Al HaMishmar ("On the lookout").

In the elections for the first Knesset, Mapam received 19 seats, making it the second largest party after the mainstream Labor Zionist Mapai. As the party did not allow non-Jews to be members at the time, it had also set up an Arab list, the Popular Arab Bloc, to contest the elections (a tactic also used by Mapai, with whom the Democratic List of Nazareth were affiliated). However, the Arab list failed to cross the 1% electoral threshold. Following the elections, the party conducted extensive negotiations with Ben-Gurion for inclusion in the coalition government, but were eventually excluded. During the session they gained one seat when Eliezer Preminger joined after leaving Maki and then setting up his own party, the Hebrew Communists.

In the 1951 elections the party dropped to 15 seats and again were not included in the coalition. However, they did become the first Zionist party to have an Israeli Arab, Rostam Bastuni, representing them in the Knesset.

From Mapam's point of view, the most important event of the second Knesset were the Prague Trials of 1953, which severely shook the party's faith in the Soviet Union. The show trials in which mostly Jewish leaders of the Communist Party of Czechoslovakia were purged, falsely implicated Mapam's envoy in Prague, Mordechai Oren, as part of a Zionist conspiracy. After the Prague Trials and later, Nikita Khrushchev's Secret Speech at the 20th Party Congress in the Soviet Union, Mapam moved away from some of their more radical left wing positions, and towards social democracy.

This created a split in the party. Avraham Berman, Rostam Bastuni and Moshe Sneh left the party and set up the Left Faction, while Hannah Lamdan and David Livschitz created their own party, the Faction independent of Ahdut HaAvoda. Although Bastuni later returned to Mapam, Berman and Sneh eventually joined Maki and Lamdan and Livschitz joined Mapai. Four other party members left to recreate Ahdut HaAvoda, though the Knesset speaker did not recognise the group as an independent party during the Knesset session. It also displeased the USSR.

Although it had been reduced to seven seats by the end of the second Knesset, the party picked up nine seats in the 1955 elections. Having effectively renounced the Soviet Union, Mapam were now included in Ben-Gurion's coalitions for both the seventh and eighth governments. However, they were to blame for Ben-Gurion's resignation and the collapse of the government on 5 July 1959 when they and Ahdut HaAvoda voted against the government on the issue of selling arms to West Germany but refused to leave the coalition.

In the 1959 elections the party retained its nine seats, and despite their previous differences, were included in Ben-Gurion's coalition.

In the 1961 elections they again won nine seats, but this time were not members of the governing coalition.

The 1965 elections saw the party lose a seat, dropping to eight mandates, but enter into the coalition government. In January 1969 the party formed an alliance with the Israeli Labor Party, which was named the Alignment. The Alignment went on to win the highest-ever number of seats in the 1969 elections (56 out of 120). At the time, Soviet commentators described Mapam as "one of the most reactionary ones among the left-socialist parties".

Mapam briefly broke away from the Alignment during the eighth Knesset, but returned shortly after. The party then remained part of the Alignment until after the 1984 elections, when it broke away due to anger over Shimon Peres's decision to form a national unity government with Likud, taking six seats with it (later reduced to five when Muhammed Wattad defected to Hadash). However, in the 1988 elections the party won only three seats.

As a result of their declining support, the party joined with Ratz and Shinui to form Meretz, a new left-wing, social-democratic and pro-peace alliance, which became the third largest party in the Knesset in the 1992 elections.

In 1995 the party's newspaper, Al HaMishmar, ceased publication.

In 1997 the merger into Meretz with Ratz and part of Shinui (much if not most of Shinui's membership did not agree with the merger, and reformed as an independent party headed by Avraham Poraz) was formalised and Mapam (and Ratz) ceased to exist.

From 1951 to 1979, Mapam also published an Arabic newspaper, Al-Mirsad ("Observation post", named similarly to the Hebrew newspaper Al HaMishmar, which means "On the lookout"). It appeared weekly, except for a short period as a daily.

1948 policy towards Arabs
Mapam entered the 1948 coalition government with a radically different policy towards Arab civilians from that being pursued by David Ben-Gurion. Mapam's executive committee advocated Jewish–Arab coexistence, opposed the expulsion of civilians and was in favour of the right of refugees to return to their homes after the war. In June 1948 all cadres were issued with a policy statement, "Our policy towards Arabs during the war", which had been written by Aharon Cohen the Head of Mapam's Arab Affairs Department . Mapam was particularly opposed to the destruction of Arab houses. Aharon Zisling, one of two Mapam members of the cabinet, raised the issue repeatedly towards the end of June. At a Mapai Centre meeting, 24 July 1948, Ben-Gurion accused Mapam of hypocrisy, citing events at Mishmar HaEmek, he said: "They faced a cruel reality ... [and] saw that there was [only] one way and that was to expel the Arab villagers and burn the villages. And they did this, and they were the first to do this."

Mapam was also opposed to the establishment of settlements on Arab land. But this created a dilemma as the kibbutz movement ideologically closest to Mapam, Kibbutz Artzi, was in the vanguard of the settlement movement. Of twelve new settlements created during May and June 1948 six were Mapam-related groups. In August 1948, proposals were put forward for the creation of 32 new settlements, all but five of which were beyond the proposed UN partition frontier. As a compromise Mapam agreed on condition that there was sufficient "surplus land" at each location to allow for the return of the original inhabitants. In the following months Mapam further diluted its position on the right of refugees to return by adding that there should be no return while a state of war existed and then it should only apply to the "peace-minded". With the explosion of opposition to the Government's proposal to the UN, 28 July 1949, that 100,000 might be allowed to return, the issue of return quietly dropped off the agenda.

The gulf between policy makers in the executive and Mapam members who dominated the leadership of the armed forces was again revealed following the military operations in the autumn of 1948. In early November the editor of the Mapam newspaper, Eliezer Pra'i, received a letter describing events at al-Dawayima. There followed a meeting of the Political Committee, 11 November 1948, which was briefed by recently ousted Chief of Staff of the Haganah, Yisrael Galili, about the killing of civilians during Operations Yoav and Hiram. Aharoh Cohen led a call for an independent inquiry. The problem for Mapam was that the commanders of these operations were senior Mapam members, Yitzhak Sadeh and Moshe Carmel. It was agreed to accept Ben-Gurion's internal inquiry.

In December party co-leader, Meir Ya'ari, publicly criticised the IDF for using the expulsion of civilians as an "imperative of strategy". This was probably directed at Mapam member Yigal Allon, who had been chief of operations during Operation Danny.

Leaders

Election results

Knesset members

See also
Labor Zionism
Hashomer Hatzair movement

References

External links
Party history Knesset website
Hashomer Hatzair/Mapam Archive at marxists.org
MAPAM A brief introduction to MAPAM's views on the Middle East and international issues. Tel Aviv, International Department of MAPAM, June 1985
MAPAM by Susan Hattis Rolef. Encyclopaedia Judaica article at encyclopedia.com

Defunct political parties in Israel
Zionist political parties in Israel
Political parties disestablished in 1997
Israel–Soviet Union relations
Socialist parties in Israel
Labor Zionism